Aqeel Karim Dhedhi (born 18 July 1957) is a Pakistani business tycoon and stock trader who is the founder and chairman of the AKD Group. The umbrella of AKD Group includes Financial Services, Real Estate, Telecom, Infrastructure and Natural Resources.

Early life and career
Dhedhi's father was Haji Abdul Karim Dhedhi, a prominent businessman. His family are Kutiyana Memons who migrated to Pakistan in 1947, originating from Junagadh. Dhedhi completed his schooling at Karachi and initiated his career by taking part in export business with his brother. He started cotton business projects when he was in seventh class. He started trading at Karachi Stock Exchange (KSE) in 1976. in 1984, he built his own office in Karachi Stock Exchange.

Karachi Stock Exchange
Dhedhi has been a stockbroker at the KSE since 1986. Prior to this, he spent 13 years managing his father's brokerage commercial projects. He was on the board of the KSE in 1996, 1997, 1999 and 2001.

In November 2013, Aqeel Karim Dhedhi laid down the foundation stone of new building of Karachi Stock Exchange (KSE). He was invited to the event as a chief guest. The ceremony was also attended by the officials of the stock exchange, senior brokers, TRE certificate holders, senior people from the financial industry and others.

Lahore Stock Exchange 
After building a strong base in Karachi Stock Exchange, Aqeel Karim Dhedhi recently became a member of the Lahore Stock Exchange.

Awards
Dhedhi was awarded the "Sitara-e-Esaar" by then president Gen. Pervez Musharraf for his services during the devastating earthquake that hit the northern areas of Pakistan in October 2005. He has also been awarded honorary PhD (Honoris Cause) degrees by private institutes like Biztek Institute of Higher Education and the Indus Institute of Higher Education.

On 23 March 2019, Aqeel Karim Dhedhi was among the few Pakistanis who were awarded with Sitara-i-Imtiaz for their matchless services to the nation.

Charity work
Dhedhi is involved with groups including community based assistance, health services, leadership development of deserving younger generation, and women empowerment. He is a trustee and member of the Board of Directors of The Shaukat Khanum Cancer Hospital; The Indus Hospital; World Memon Organization and the Resource Development Committee of Agha Khan University Hospital. He also takes interest in health services, women empowerment, leadership development of young generation and community based assistance.

Hum Aur Aab Initiative 
Aqeel Karim Dhedhi is a part of a local initiative called "Hum Aur Aab" aimed at creating awareness about water consumption and to solve the water crisis of Pakistan at both, national and international levels.

Promoting Sports in Pakistan 
Aqeel Karim Dhedhi being a great fan of sports himself has contributed a lot in promoting sports culture in the country. The Arkadians, one of Dhedhi's ventures sponsors Karachi Kings, one of the six teams participating in Pakistan Super League.

Moreover, he also showed an interest in purchasing the franchise of the sixth team after Multan Sultans meltdown.

References

1957 births
Living people
Pakistani business executives
Businesspeople from Karachi
Memon people
Pakistani people of Gujarati descent
Recipients of Sitara-i-Imtiaz
Pakistani Muslims
Pakistani stock traders